The 2014 LPGA Tour was a series of weekly golf tournaments for elite female golfers from around the world. The Tour began at Ocean Club Golf Course on Paradise Island in The Bahamas on January 23 and ended on November 23 at Grand Cypress Golf Club in Orlando, Florida. The tournaments were sanctioned by the United States-based Ladies Professional Golf Association (LPGA).

The most significant addition to the Tour in 2014 was a new team event, the International Crown. To be held each even-numbered year (those in which the Solheim Cup is not held), the event involved four-woman teams from eight countries competing in a four-day match play format. The eight qualifying countries were those whose four top players are cumulatively ranked highest in the Women's World Golf Rankings as of the end of the preceding LPGA season. The individual participants from each qualified country were determined by the rankings immediately prior to the Kraft Nabisco Championship.

Qualification for the season-ending CME Group Tour Championship changed for 2014 and a $1 million bonus was added. Previously, the top three finishers in each tournament, not previously qualified, earned entry to the tournament. The field in 2014 was determined by a season-long points race, the "Race to the CME Globe". All players making the cut in a tournament earned points with 500 points going to the winner. The five major champions had a higher points distribution with 625 points to the winner. No-cut tournaments only awarded points to the top 40 finishers (top 20 for the Lorena Ochoa Invitational). Only LPGA members were eligible to earn points. The top 72 players on the points list gained entry into the Tour Championship as well as any tournament winners, whether or not an LPGA member, not in the top 72. Points were reset before the tournament such that only the top three players were guaranteed to win the Race by winning the tournament and only the top nine had a mathematical chance of winning the Race. The winner of the points race received a $1 million bonus that did not count on the official money list. The Race is similar to the PGA Tour's FedEx Cup and the European Tour's Race to Dubai.

Schedule and results
The number in parentheses after winners' names is the player's total number wins in official money individual events on the LPGA Tour, including that event.

^ Event held over to Monday, July 27 due to lack of daylight. The event was also shortened to 54 holes.

Season leaders
Money list leaders

Full 2014 Official Money List

Scoring average leaders

Full 2014 Scoring Average List

Awards

See also
2014 Ladies European Tour
2014 Symetra Tour

References

External links
Official site

LPGA Tour seasons
LPGA Tour